"Night Moves On" is a song by English electronic/pop artist Abigail Zsiga, taken from her album Feel Good.
The song was produced by Nigel Swanston and Tim Cox, collectively known as the "Band of Gypsies"

Track listing
 "Night Moves On" (radio edit) - 3:33
  "Night Moves On" (Stone & Nice Radio Edit) - 3:54
  "Night Moves On" (Rhythm Masters' Trip Hip Dub) - 8:43
  "Night Moves On" (Stone & Nice Club Mix) - 7:15
  "Night Moves On" (Band of Gypsies Full On Vocal Mix) - 5:38
  "Night Moves On" (Band of Gypsies Orchestral Mix) - 7:06

Personnel
 Abigail Zsiga - vocals
 Nigel Swanston - all instrument programming
 Tim Cox - engineering, mixing, bass

Charts

References

1996 singles
1996 songs
Breakbeat songs
Pulse 8 singles
Songs written by Nigel Swanston